New York's 131st State Assembly district is one of the 150 districts in the New York State Assembly. It has been represented by Jeff Gallahan since 2021, succeeding Brian Kolb.

Geography
District 131 contains portions of Ontario, Cayuga, Cortland, Madison, Chenango, Broome and Seneca counties. Prior to 2021, the discrict contained all of Ontario County and portions of Seneca County.

Recent election results

2022

2020

2018

2016

2014

2012

References

131